Theunis is a Dutch masculine given name. Like Teunis, it is a derivative of Anthonius (Anthony). It is considered a diminutive form of Antonius, Anthonius used in Belgium, Netherlands, Suriname, South Africa, Namibia, and Indonesia. Theuns is a short form used in South Africa. Both Theunis and Theuns also exist as a patronymic surname

Given name
 Theunis de Bruyn (born 1992), South African cricketer
 Theunis Willem de Jongh, South African banker
 Theuns Jordaan (born 1971), South African singer and songwriter
 Theuns Kotzé (born 1987), Namibian rugby player
 Theunis van Leeuwenhoek (1632–1723), Dutch microscopist and microbiologist
 Theunis Piersma (born 1958), Dutch biologist
 Theunis van Schalkwyk (1929–2005), South African boxer
 Theunis Spangenberg (born 1983), South African golfer.
 Theuns Stofberg (born 1955), South African rugby player
 Theuns Duvenhage (born 1985), South African electrical engineer

Surname
 Davy Theunis (born 1980), Belgian football player
 Edward Theuns (born 1991), Belgian racing cyclist
 Jan Theuns (1877–1961), Dutch painter 
 Georges Theunis (1873–1966), Belgian prime minister
 Paul Theunis (born 1952), Belgian footballer

References

See also

Antheunis
Teunis
Teun
Theuns

Dutch masculine given names
Patronymic surnames